FC Stade Lausanne Ouchy, sometimes referred to as SLO, is a Swiss football club based in Ouchy, Lausanne. They currently play in the Swiss Challenge League after achieving promotion in 2019.

History
The club is the result of a merger between FC Ouchy-Olympic and FC Stade Lausanne in 2001.

FC Ouchy-Olympic's story began in 1895 as FC La Villa Ouchy. As founding members of the Swiss Football Association, they competed in the first Serie A season during 1897–98, but later mostly played in the lower divisions. The initial forerunner to the latter club was founded in 1901 as FC Signal Lausanne, which became Stade Lausanne in 1926, also introducing athletics, field hockey and shooting sports departments. They competed in the second division and narrowly failed to achieve promotion to the Serie A in 1929. Henri Guisan acted as president between 1929 and 1939, when his position became honorary as he led the Swiss army's mobilization during World War II. He emphasized the importance of sport to stay healthy, for civilians but especially soldiers. They continued to compete in the lower divisions following his departure, playing in the 1. Liga as late as 1963–64.

After the two clubs combined, the were eventually promoted to the 2. Liga Interregional in 2005, where they stayed until 2014. They reached the Promotion League by 2017, where they had a notable cup run in the 2017–18 season, beating first division side FC Sion to reach the round of 16. After promotion to the Challenge League, the club was forced to relocate outside the city to Nyon as their previous pitch failed to meet the requirements for professional football, but now play at Stade Olympique de la Pontaise.

Honours 
Swiss Promotion League
Winners (1): 2019

Current squad

Out on loan

Notable former employees 

 Richard Durr, Swiss international capped 29 times, worked as player, manager, and president of Stade Lausanne
 Norbert Eschmann, Swiss international capped 15 times, played in the youth team 1949–50
 Henri Guisan, acted as president 1929–1939
 Blaise Nkufo played in the youth teams 1988–1992.

Coaching staff

References

External links 

 Official Website (in French)

 
Football clubs in Switzerland
Lausanne
Association football clubs established in 1901
1901 establishments in Switzerland